
Lantz may refer to:

People 
 Lantz (surname), a surname of German and Swedish origin
 Lantz (given name)

Places

Canada
Lantz, Nova Scotia

Spain
Lantz, Spain, Navarre

United States
Lantz, West Virginia
Lantz Arena in Charleston, Illinois
Lantz Corners, Pennsylvania
Lantz Farm and Nature Preserve Wildlife Management Area, West Virginia
Lantz Hall, in Virginia
Lantz Mill, in Virginia
Lantz-Zeigler House, in Maryland

See also 
Lantz v. Coleman, a Connecticut superior court case in the United States
Lanz (disambiguation)